Iridomyrmex suchieroides is a species of ant in the genus Iridomyrmex. The ant was described by Heterick and Shattuck in 2011, and is endemic to almost all of Australia except for Tasmania.

Etymology
The name derives from the Greek Language, which oides translates to 'like', plus suchieri.

References

Iridomyrmex
Hymenoptera of Australia
Insects described in 2011